A Greater Song is a live album by Paul Baloche released in 2006.  The album was recorded at Community Christian Fellowship in Lindale, Texas, where he served as the Worship Pastor at the time.  The album features Kathryn Scott on three of the songs.  Baloche co-wrote the songs on the album with songwriters such as Sara Groves, Graham Kendrick, Glenn Packiam, Don Moen, Brenton Brown, and Matt Redman.

Track listing
"Hosanna (Praise Is Rising)" (Paul Baloche, Brenton Brown) – 6:44
"Because of Your Love" (Baloche, Brown) – 4:05
"A Greater Song" (Baloche, Matt Redman) – 6:50
"I Will Boast" (Baloche) – 5:20
"Your Name" (Glenn Packiam) – 5:44
"What Can I Do" (Baloche, Graham Kendrick) – 5:19
"You Have Been So Good" (Baloche, Sara Groves) – 4:00
"Thank You Lord" (Baloche, Don Moen) – 4:03
"Creation's King" (Baloche, Kendrick) – 4:39
"Here and Now" (Baloche, Brown) – 5:13
"Just as I Am" (Traditional) – 1:04
"Rising" (Baloche, Redman) – 4:48

Personnel 
 Paul Baloche – lead vocals, acoustic guitars, electric guitars
 Chris Springer – acoustic piano, keyboards, Hammond B3 organ
 Gary Leach – acoustic piano (7)
 Austin Deptula – programming, loops, strings
 Ben Gowell – acoustic guitars, electric guitars
 Milo Deering – dobro, mandolin, violin 
 Don Harris – electric bass, fretless bass 
 Carl Albrecht – drums, percussion
 Ty Young – cello 
 David Baloche – French horn, backing vocals 
 Rita Baloche – backing vocals
 Michael Mellett – backing vocals
 Kathryn Scott – vocal soloist (5, 10, 11)
 Sara Groves – lead vocals (7)

Production 
 Don Moen – executive producer
 Chris Springer – A&R 
 Paul Baloche – producer 
 Austin Deptula – producer, engineer  
 F. Reid Shippen – mixing 
 Richard Dodd – mastering 
 Riordan Design Group, Inc. – design 
 Joshua Dunford – photography

Reception

References

2006 live albums
Paul Baloche albums